Asta Elisabeth Backman née Inberg (4 February 1917 in Vaasa – 18 February 2010 in Helsinki) was a Finnish film, television and theatre actress who appeared in more than 80 works.

Early life
She was born Agda Elisabeth Inberg in Vaasa, Finland.

Career
Since 1946, Backman has appeared in ten films and almost fifty television productions.

Film and television work 

Täällä Pohjantähden Alla (1968) Here Beneath The North Star

Akseli Ja Elina (1970) Askeli And Elina
Synnin Jäljet (1946)
Ylijäämänainen (1951)
Veteraanin Voitto (1955)
Pastori Jussilainen (1955)
Neiti Talonmies (1955)
Kustaa III (1963)
Kuuma Kissa? (1968)
Täällä Pohjantähden Alla
Kesyttömät Veljekset (1969)
Pohjantähti (1973)
Runoilija ja Muusa (1978)
Olga (1978)
Vihreän Kullan Maa (1987), television series

Personal life
She was married, until his death in 1993, to the German actor Fritz-Hugo Backman.

References

External links

1917 births
2010 deaths
People from Vaasa
People from Vaasa Province (Grand Duchy of Finland)
Finnish film actresses
Finnish stage actresses
Finnish television actresses